Juma Hilal Faraj  is a Bahraini footballer who played for Bahrain in the 1988 Asian Cup.

References

1988 AFC Asian Cup players
Bahraini footballers
Living people
Association football defenders
Year of birth missing (living people)
Bahrain international footballers